Frederic David Marks (21 June 1868 – 6 May 1952) was an English first-class cricketer who played one match for Somerset County Cricket Club in 1884.

References

1868 births
1952 deaths
English cricketers
Somerset cricketers
Wiltshire cricketers